Dinis da Silva Gomes Resende (born 15 April 1967 in Paços de Brandão, Santa Maria da Feira, Aveiro District), known simply as Dinis, is a Portuguese former footballer who played as a central defender.

References

External links

1967 births
Living people
Sportspeople from Santa Maria da Feira
Portuguese footballers
Association football defenders
Primeira Liga players
Liga Portugal 2 players
Segunda Divisão players
C.D. Feirense players
S.C. Beira-Mar players
Associação Académica de Coimbra – O.A.F. players
C.F. União de Lamas players
Gil Vicente F.C. players
F.C. Maia players
Gondomar S.C. players